In 2001, Eric Roberson released the critically acclaimed, limited edition CD, The Esoteric Movement.

Track listing

2001 albums
Eric Roberson albums